

Events

Pre-1600
 308 – At Carnuntum, Emperor emeritus Diocletian confers with Galerius, Augustus of the East, and Maximianus, the recently returned former Augustus of the West, in an attempt to end the civil wars of the Tetrarchy.
1028 – Constantine VIII dies, ending his uninterrupted reign as emperor or co-emperor of the Byzantine Empire of 66 years.
1100 – Henry I of England marries Matilda of Scotland, the daughter of Malcolm III of Scotland and a direct descendant of the Saxon king Edmund Ironside; Matilda is crowned on the same day.
1215 – The Fourth Council of the Lateran meets, defining the doctrine of transubstantiation, the process by which bread and wine are, by that doctrine, said to transform into the body and blood of Christ.
1500 – Treaty of Granada: Louis XII of France and Ferdinand II of Aragon agree to divide the Kingdom of Naples between them.
1572 – Tycho Brahe observes the supernova SN 1572.

1601–1900
1620 – The Mayflower Compact is signed in what is now Provincetown Harbor near Cape Cod.
1634 – Following pressure from Anglican bishop John Atherton, the Irish House of Commons passes An Act for the Punishment for the Vice of Buggery.
1673 – Second Battle of Khotyn in Ukraine: Polish–Lithuanian Commonwealth forces under the command of Jan Sobieski defeat the Ottoman army. In this battle, rockets made by Kazimierz Siemienowicz are successfully used.
1675 – Gottfried Leibniz demonstrates integral calculus for the first time to find the area under the graph of y = ƒ(x).
1724 – Joseph Blake, alias Blueskin, a highwayman known for attacking "Thief-Taker General" (and thief) Jonathan Wild at the Old Bailey, is hanged in London.
1750 – Riots break out in Lhasa after the murder of the Tibetan regent.
  1750   – The F.H.C. Society, also known as the Flat Hat Club, is formed at Raleigh Tavern, Williamsburg, Virginia. It is the first college fraternity.
1778 – Cherry Valley massacre: Loyalists and Seneca Indian forces attack a fort and village in eastern New York during the American Revolutionary War, killing more than forty civilians and soldiers.
1805 – Napoleonic Wars: Battle of Dürenstein: Eight thousand French troops attempt to slow the retreat of a vastly superior Russian and Austrian force.
1813 – War of 1812: Battle of Crysler's Farm: British and Canadian forces defeat a larger American force, causing the Americans to abandon their Saint Lawrence campaign.
1831 – In Jerusalem, Virginia, Nat Turner is hanged after inciting a violent slave uprising.
1839 – The Virginia Military Institute is founded in Lexington, Virginia.
1855 – A powerful earthquake occurs in Edo, Japan, causing considerable damage in the Kantō region from the shaking and subsequent fires. It had a death toll of 7,000–10,000 people and destroyed around 14,000 buildings.
1865 – Treaty of Sinchula is signed whereby Bhutan cedes the areas east of the Teesta River to the British East India Company.
1869 – The Victorian Aboriginal Protection Act is enacted in Australia, giving the government control of indigenous people's wages, their terms of employment, where they could live, and of their children, effectively leading to the Stolen Generations.
1880 – Australian bushranger Ned Kelly is hanged at Melbourne Gaol.
1887 – August Spies, Albert Parsons, Adolph Fischer and George Engel are executed as a result of the Haymarket affair.
1889 – The State of Washington is admitted as the 42nd state of the United States.

1901–present
1911 – Many cities in the Midwestern United States break their record highs and lows on the same day as a strong cold front rolls through.
1918 – World War I: Germany signs an armistice agreement with the Allies in a railroad car in the forest of Compiègne.
  1918   – Józef Piłsudski assumes supreme military power in Poland – symbolic first day of Polish independence.
  1918   – Emperor Charles I of Austria relinquishes power.
1919 – The Industrial Workers of the World attack an Armistice Day parade in Centralia, Washington, ultimately resulting in the deaths of five people.
  1919   – Latvian forces defeat the West Russian Volunteer Army at Riga in the Latvian War of Independence.
1921 – The Tomb of the Unknowns is dedicated by US President Warren G. Harding at Arlington National Cemetery.
1923 – Adolf Hitler is arrested in Munich for high treason for his role in the Beer Hall Putsch.
1926 – The United States Numbered Highway System is established.
1930 – Patent number US1781541 is awarded to Albert Einstein and Leó Szilárd for their invention, the Einstein refrigerator.
1934 – The Shrine of Remembrance is opened in Melbourne, Australia.
1940 – World War II: In the Battle of Taranto, the Royal Navy launches the first all-aircraft ship-to-ship naval attack in history.
  1940   – World War II: The German auxiliary cruiser Atlantis captures top secret British mail from the Automedon, and sends it to Japan.
1942 – World War II: France's zone libre is occupied by German forces in Case Anton.
1960 – A military coup against President Ngô Đình Diệm of South Vietnam is crushed.
1961 – Thirteen Italian Air Force servicemen, deployed to the Congo as a part of the UN peacekeeping force, are massacred by a mob in Kindu. 
1962 – Kuwait's National Assembly ratifies the Constitution of Kuwait.
1965 – Southern Rhodesia's Prime Minister Ian Smith unilaterally declares the colony independent as the unrecognised state of Rhodesia.
  1965   – United Airlines Flight 227 crashes at Salt Lake City International Airport, killing 43.
1966 – NASA launches Gemini 12.
1967 – Vietnam War: In a propaganda ceremony in Phnom Penh, Cambodia, three American prisoners of war are released by the Viet Cong and turned over to "new left" antiwar activist Tom Hayden.
1968 – Vietnam War: Operation Commando Hunt initiated. The goal is to interdict men and supplies on the Ho Chi Minh trail, through Laos into South Vietnam.
1972 – Vietnam War: Vietnamization: The United States Army turns over the massive Long Binh military base to South Vietnam.
1975 – Australian constitutional crisis of 1975: Australian Governor-General Sir John Kerr dismisses the government of Gough Whitlam, appoints Malcolm Fraser as caretaker Prime Minister and announces a general election to be held in early December.
  1975   – Independence of Angola.
1977 – A munitions explosion at a train station in Iri, South Korea kills at least 56 people.
1981 – Antigua and Barbuda joins the United Nations.
1992 – The General Synod of the Church of England votes to allow women to become priests.
1993 – A sculpture honoring women who served in the Vietnam War is dedicated at the Vietnam Veterans Memorial in Washington, D.C.
1999 – The House of Lords Act is given Royal Assent, restricting membership of the British House of Lords by virtue of a hereditary peerage.
2000 – Kaprun disaster: One hundred fifty-five skiers and snowboarders die when a cable car catches fire in an alpine tunnel in Kaprun, Austria.
2001 – Journalists Pierre Billaud, Johanne Sutton and Volker Handloik are killed in Afghanistan during an attack on the convoy they are traveling in.
2002 – A Fokker F27 Friendship operating as Laoag International Airlines Flight 585 crashes into Manila Bay shortly after takeoff from Ninoy Aquino International Airport, killing 19 people.
2004 – New Zealand Tomb of the Unknown Warrior is dedicated at the National War Memorial, Wellington.
  2004   – The Palestine Liberation Organization confirms the death of Yasser Arafat from unidentified causes. Mahmoud Abbas is elected chairman of the PLO minutes later.
2006 – Her Majesty Queen Elizabeth II unveils the New Zealand War Memorial in London, United Kingdom, commemorating the loss of soldiers from the New Zealand Army and the British Army.
2011 – A helicopter crash just outside Mexico City kills seven, including Francisco Blake Mora the Secretary of the Interior of Mexico.
2012 – A strong earthquake with the magnitude 6.8 hits northern Burma, killing at least 26 people.
2014 – Fifty-eight people are killed in a bus crash in the Sukkur District in southern Pakistan's Sindh province.
2020 – Typhoon Vamco makes landfall in Luzon and several offshore islands, killing 67 people. The storm causes the worst floods in the region since Typhoon Ketsana in 2009.
2022 – Russo-Ukrainian War: Ukrainian armed forces enter the city of Kherson following a successful two-month southern counteroffensive.

Births

Pre-1600
1050 – Henry IV, Holy Roman Emperor (d. 1106)
1154 – Sancho I of Portugal (d. 1212)
1155 – Alfonso VIII of Castile (d. 1214)
1220 – Alphonse, Count of Poitiers (d. 1271)
1430 – Jošt of Rožmberk, Bishop of Breslau (d. 1467)
1441 – Charlotte of Savoy, French queen (d. 1483)
1449 – Catherine of Poděbrady, Hungarian queen (d. 1464)
1491 – Martin Bucer, German Protestant reformer (d. 1551)
1493 – Paracelsus, Swiss-German physician, botanist, astrologer, and occultist (d. 1541)
1512 – Marcin Kromer, Prince-Bishop of Warmia (d. 1589)
1569 – Martin Ruland the Younger, German physician and chemist (d. 1611)
1579 – Frans Snyders, Flemish painter (d. 1657)
1599 – Maria Eleonora of Brandenburg (d. 1655)
  1599   – Ottavio Piccolomini, Austrian-Italian field marshal (d. 1656)

1601–1900
1633 – George Savile, 1st Marquess of Halifax, English politician, Lord President of the Council (d. 1695)
1668 – Johann Albert Fabricius, German author and scholar (d. 1736)
1696 – Andrea Zani, Italian violinist and composer (d. 1757)
1743 – Carl Peter Thunberg, Swedish botanist, entomologist, and psychologist (d. 1828)
1748 – Charles IV of Spain (d. 1819)
1768 – Sikandar Jah, (d. 1829) 3rd Nizam of Hyderabad State
1791 – Josef Munzinger, Swiss lawyer and politician, 3rd President of the Swiss Confederation (d. 1855)
1821 – Fyodor Dostoevsky, Russian novelist, short story writer, essayist, and philosopher (d. 1881)
1836 – Thomas Bailey Aldrich, American poet and author (d. 1907)
1852 – Franz Conrad von Hötzendorf, Austrian-Hungarian field marshal (d. 1925)
1855 – Stevan Sremac, Serbian author and activist (d. 1906)
1857 – Janet Erskine Stuart, English nun and educator (d. 1914)
1860 – Thomas Joseph Byrnes, Australian politician, 12th Premier of Queensland (d. 1898)
1863 – Paul Signac, French painter and educator (d. 1935)
1864 – Alfred Hermann Fried, Austrian journalist and activist, Nobel Prize laureate (d. 1921)
1866 – Martha Annie Whiteley, English chemist and mathematician (d. 1956)
1867 – Shrimad Rajchandra, a Jain philosopher, spiritual mentor of Mahatma Gandhi (d. 1901)
1868 – Édouard Vuillard, French painter and academic (d. 1940)
1869 – Victor Emmanuel III of Italy (d. 1947)
  1869   – Gaetano Bresci, Italian anarchist assassin (d. 1901)
1872 – Maude Adams, American actress (d. 1953)
  1872   – David I. Walsh, American lawyer and politician, 46th Governor of Massachusetts (d. 1947)
1882 – Gustaf VI Adolf of Sweden (d. 1973)
1883 – Ernest Ansermet, Swiss conductor and academic (d. 1969)
1885 – George S. Patton, American general (d. 1945)
1887 – Roland Young, English-American actor (d. 1953)
1888 – Abul Kalam Azad, Indian activist, scholar, and politician, Indian Minister of Education (d. 1958)
  1888   – J. B. Kripalani, Indian lawyer and politician (d.1982)
1891 – Rabbit Maranville, American baseball player and manager (d. 1954)
  1891   – Grunya Sukhareva, Ukrainian-Russian psychiatrist and university lecturer (d. 1981)
1894 – Beverly Bayne, American actress (d. 1982)
1895 – Wealthy Babcock, American mathematician and academic (d. 1990)
1896 – Shirley Graham Du Bois, American author, playwright, composer, and activist (d. 1977)
  1896   – Carlos Eduardo Castañeda, Mexican-American historian (d. 1958)
1898 – René Clair, French actor, director, producer, and screenwriter (d. 1981)
1899 – Pat O'Brien, American actor (d. 1983)
1900 – Maria Babanova, Russian stage and film actress (d. 1983)

1901–present
1901 – Sam Spiegel, American film producer (d. 1985)
  1901   – F. Van Wyck Mason, American historian and author (d. 1978)
1904 – Alger Hiss, American lawyer and convicted spy (d. 1996)
  1904   – J. H. C. Whitehead, British mathematician and academic (d. 1960)
1906 – Brother Theodore, German-American monologuist and comedian (d. 2001)
1907 – Orestis Laskos, Greek director, screenwriter, and poet (d. 1992)
1909 – Robert Ryan, American actor (d. 1973)
  1909   – Piero Scotti, Italian race car driver (d. 1976)
1911 – Roberto Matta, Chilean-Italian painter and sculptor (d. 2002)
1912 – Thomas C. Mann, American lawyer, politician, and diplomat, United States Ambassador to El Salvador (d. 1999)
1914 – James Gilbert Baker, American astronomer, optician, and academic (d. 2005)
  1914   – Taslim Olawale Elias, Nigerian academic and jurist, 2nd Chief Justice of Nigeria (d. 1991)
  1914   – Howard Fast, American novelist and screenwriter (d. 2003)
  1914   – Henry Wade, American soldier and lawyer (d. 2001)
  1914   – Daisy Bates,  American activist who played a leading role in the Little Rock Integration Crisis of 1957 (d. 1999)
1915 – William Proxmire, American soldier, journalist, and politician (d. 2005)
  1915   – Anna Schwartz, American economist and author (d. 2012)
1916 – Robert Carr, English engineer and politician, Lord President of the Council (d. 2012)
1918 – Stubby Kaye, American entertainer (d. 1997)
1919 – Kalle Päätalo, Finnish soldier and author (d. 2000)
1920 – Roy Jenkins, British politician, President of the European Commission (d. 2003)
  1920   – Walter Krupinski, German captain and pilot (d. 2000)
1921 – Terrel Bell, American sergeant, academic, and politician, 2nd United States Secretary of Education (d. 1996)
1922 – Kurt Vonnegut, American novelist, short story writer, and essayist (d. 2007)
1925 – John Guillermin, English-American director, producer, and screenwriter (d. 2015)
  1925   – June Whitfield, English actress (d. 2018)
  1925   – Jonathan Winters, American actor and screenwriter (d. 2013)
1926 – Harry Lumley, Canadian ice hockey player (d. 1998)
  1926   – Maria Teresa de Filippis, Italian race car driver (d. 2016)
1927 – Mose Allison, American singer-songwriter and pianist (d. 2016)
  1927   – Martin Špegelj, Croatian general and politician, 2nd Croatian Minister of Defence (d. 2014)
1928 – Ernestine Anderson, American singer (d. 2016)
  1928   – Carlos Fuentes, Mexican novelist and essayist (d. 2012)
1929 – LaVern Baker, American singer (d. 1997)
  1929   – Hans Magnus Enzensberger, German author and poet (d. 2022)
  1929   – Martin Jacomb, English lawyer, businessman, and academic
1930 – Hugh Everett III, American physicist and mathematician (d. 1982)
  1930   – Vernon Handley, English conductor (d. 2008)
  1930   – Mildred Dresselhaus, American physicist and academic (d. 2017) 
1932 – Germano Mosconi, Italian journalist (d. 2012)
1933 – Martino Finotto, Italian race car driver (d. 2014)
  1933   – Peter B. Lewis, American businessman and philanthropist (d. 2013)
1935 – Bibi Andersson, Swedish actress  (d. 2019)
1936 – Jack Keller, American songwriter and producer (d. 2005)
1937 – Vittorio Brambilla, Italian race car driver (d. 2001)
  1937   – Stephen Lewis, Canadian politician and diplomat, 14th Canadian Ambassador to the United Nations
  1937   – Alicia Ostriker, American poet and scholar
1939 – Denise Alexander, American actress 
1940 – Barbara Boxer, American journalist and politician
  1940   – Dennis Coffey, American guitarist 
1942 – Jonathan Fenby, English journalist and businessman
  1942   – Roy Fredericks, Guyanese-American cricketer and politician (d. 2000)
  1942   – K. Connie Kang, Korean American journalist and author (d. 2019)
  1942   – Diane Wolkstein, American author and radio host (d. 2013)
1943 – Doug Frost, Australian swim coach
1945 – Chris Dreja, English guitarist and songwriter 
  1945   – Vince Martell, American singer and guitarist 
  1945   – Daniel Ortega, Nicaraguan politician, President of Nicaragua
1946 – Al Holbert, American race car driver (d. 1988)
1948 – Andrzej Czok, Polish mountaineer (d. 1986)
  1948   – Vincent Schiavelli, American actor (d. 2005)
  1948   – Robert John "Mutt" Lange, British-South African record producer and songwriter
1949 – Ismail Petra of Kelantan, former Sultan of Kelantan (d. 2019)
  1949   – Kathy Postlewait, American golfer
1950 – Mircea Dinescu, Romanian journalist and poet
  1950   – Jim Peterik, American singer-songwriter and guitarist 
1951 – Kim Peek, American megasavant (d. 2009)
  1951   – Marc Summers, American television host and producer
  1951   – Fuzzy Zoeller, American golfer
1953 – Marshall Crenshaw, American singer-songwriter and guitarist
  1953   – Andy Partridge, English singer-songwriter, guitarist, and record producer
1954 – Steve Brain, English rugby player
  1954   – Mary Gaitskill, American novelist, essayist, and short story writer.
  1954   – Roger Slifer, American author, illustrator, screenwriter, and producer (d. 2015)
1955 – Dave Alvin, American singer-songwriter and guitarist 
  1955   – Jigme Singye Wangchuk, King of Bhutan
  1955   – Teri York, Canadian diver
1956 – Ian Craig Marsh, English guitarist 
  1956   – Talat Aziz, Ghazal singer
1958 – Luz Casal, Spanish singer-songwriter and actress
  1958   – Kazimieras Černis, Lithuanian astronomer and astrophysicist
  1958   – Carlos Lacámara, Cuban-American actor and playwright
  1958   – Kathy Lette, Australian-English author
1959 – Lee Haney, American bodybuilder
  1959   – Richard Rowe, English jockey and trainer
  1959   – Christian Schwarzenegger, Swiss criminologist and academic
  1959   – Carl Williams, American boxer (d. 2013)
1960 – Colin Harvey, English author and critic (d. 2011)
  1960   – Chuck Hernandez, American baseball player and coach
  1960   – Paquito Ochoa, Jr., Filipino lawyer and politician, 37th Executive Secretary of the Philippines
  1960   – Cristina Odone, Kenyan-Italian journalist and author
  1960   – Peter Parros, American actor, producer, and screenwriter
  1960   – Stanley Tucci, American actor and director
1961 – Yuri Milner, Russian-born entrepreneur, venture capitalist and physicist
1962 – Mario Fenech, Maltese-Australian rugby league player and sportscaster
  1962   – Georgios Mitsibonas, Greek footballer (d. 1997)
  1962   – Demi Moore, American actress, director, and producer
  1962   – James Morrison, Australian trumpet player and composer
1963 – Billy Gunn, American wrestler and actor
1964 – Margarete Bagshaw, American painter and potter (d. 2015)
  1964   – Calista Flockhart, American actress
  1964   – Philip McKeon, American actor (d. 2019)
1965 – Max Mutchnick, American screenwriter and producer
  1965   – Kim Stockwood, Canadian singer-songwriter 
1966 – Benedicta Boccoli, Italian model and actress
  1966   – Vince Colosimo, Australian actor
  1966   – Alison Doody, Irish model and actress
1967 – Gil de Ferran, Brazilian race car driver
  1967   – David Doak, Northern Irish video game designer
  1967   – Frank John Hughes, American actor, producer, and screenwriter
1968 – David L. Cook, American singer-songwriter and comedian
  1968   – Diego Fuser, Italian footballer and manager
1971 – David DeLuise, American actor and director
  1971   – Tomas Pačėsas, Lithuanian basketball player and coach
1972 – Adam Beach, Canadian actor
1973 – Jason White, American singer-songwriter and guitarist 
1974 – Jon B., American singer-songwriter and producer
  1974   – Leonardo DiCaprio, American actor and producer
  1974   – Static Major, American singer-songwriter and producer (d. 2008)
  1974   – Wajahatullah Wasti, Pakistani cricketer
1975 – Daisuke Ohata, Japanese rugby player
1976 – Jason Grilli, American baseball player
  1976   – Jesse F. Keeler, Canadian bass player 
1977 – Ben Hollioake, Australian-English cricketer (d. 2002)
  1977   – Jill Vedder, American philanthropist, activist and fashion model
  1977   – Maniche, Portuguese footballer and manager
  1977   – Marsha Mehran, Iranian-American author (d. 2014)
1978 – Lou Vincent, New Zealand cricketer
1980 – Willie Parker, American football player and coach
  1980   – Edmoore Takaendesa, Zimbabwean-German rugby player
1982 – Gonzalo Canale, Argentinian-Italian rugby player
  1982   – Jeremy Williams, English model, actor, and poet
1983 – Arouna Koné, Ivorian footballer
  1983   – Philipp Lahm, German footballer
  1983   – Tatsuhisa Suzuki, Japanese voice actor and singer
1984 – Stephen Hunt, English footballer
  1984   – Birkir Már Sævarsson, Icelandic footballer
1985 – Osvaldo Alonso, Cuban footballer
  1985   – Austin Collie, American football player
  1985   – Tiidrek Nurme, Estonian runner
  1985   – Jessica Sierra, American singer
  1985   – Robin Uthappa, Indian cricketer
1986 – François Trinh-Duc, French rugby player
  1986   – Jon Batiste, American singer and pianist
  1986   – Mark Sanchez, American football player
  1986   – Victor Cruz, American football player
1987 – Vinny Guadagnino, American actor
  1987   – Chanelle Hayes, English model and singer
1988 – David Depetris, Argentinian-Slovak footballer
  1988   – Mikako Komatsu, Japanese voice actress and singer
  1988   – Kyle Naughton, English footballer
1989 – Nick Blackman, English-Israeli footballer
  1989   – Joe Ragland, American basketball player
  1989   – Adam Rippon, American figure skater
  1989   – Reina Tanaka, Japanese singer 
  1989   – Lewis Williamson, Scottish race car driver
1990 – James Segeyaro, Papua New Guinean rugby league player
  1990   – Tom Dumoulin, Dutch road bicycle racer
  1990   – Georginio Wijnaldum, Dutch footballer
1992 – Sofía Luini, Argentine tennis player
1993 – Jamaal Lascelles, English footballer
1994 – Ellie Simmonds, English swimmer
  1994   – Sanju Samson, Indian cricketer
1995 – Josh Aloiai, New Zealand rugby league player
  1995   – Yuriko Miyazaki, British tennis player
1998 – Liudmila Samsonova, Russian tennis player

Deaths

Pre-1600
 405 – Arsacius of Tarsus, Tarsian archbishop (b. 324)
 683 – Yazid I, Muslim caliph (b. 647)
 865 – Petronas, Byzantine general
   865   – Antony the Younger, Byzantine monk and saint (b. 785)
 875 – Teutberga, queen of Lotharingia
1028 – Constantine VIII, Byzantine emperor (b. 960)
1078 – Udo of Nellenburg, Archbishop of Trier (during the siege of Tübingen)
1089 – Saint Peter Igneus, Italian Benedictine monk
1130 – Teresa of León, Countess of Portugal, Portuguese regent (b. 1080)
1189 – King William II of Sicily ("the Good") (b. 1153)
1285 – King Peter III of Aragon (b. 1239)
1331 – Stefan Uroš III Dečanski of Serbia (b. c. 1285)
1561 – Hans Tausen, Danish reformer (b. 1494)
1583 – Gerald FitzGerald, 14th Earl of Desmond, Irish rebel

1601–1900
1623 – Philippe de Mornay, French theorist and author (b. 1549)
1638 – Cornelis van Haarlem, Dutch painter and illustrator (b. 1562)
1724 – Joseph Blake, English criminal (b. 1700)
1812 – Platon Levshin, Russian metropolitan (b. 1737)
1831 – Nat Turner, American slave and rebel leader (b. 1800)
1855 – Søren Kierkegaard, Danish philosopher, author, and poet (b. 1813)
1861 – Pedro V of Portugal (b. 1837)
1862 – James Madison Porter, American lawyer and politician, 18th United States Secretary of War (b. 1793)
1880 – Ned Kelly, Australian criminal (b. 1855)
  1880   – Lucretia Mott, American activist (b. 1793)
1884 – Alfred Brehm, German zoologist, author, and illustrator (b. 1827)
1887 – Haymarket affair defendants:
  1887   – George Engel, German-American businessman and activist (b. 1836)
  1887   – Adolph Fischer, German-American printer and activist (b. 1858)
  1887   – Albert Parsons, American journalist and activist (b. 1848)
  1887   – August Spies, American journalist and activist (b. 1855)
1888 – Pedro Ñancúpel, Chilean pirate active in the fjords and channels of Patagonia. He was executed.

1901–present
1917 – Liliuokalani of Hawaii (b. 1838)
1918 – George Lawrence Price, Canadian soldier (b. 1892)
1919 – Pavel Chistyakov, Russian painter and educator (b. 1832)
1921 – Léon Moreaux, French target shooter (b. 1852)
1931 – Shibusawa Eiichi, Japanese businessman (b. 1840)
1939 – Bob Marshall, American author and activist (b. 1901)
1940 – Muhittin Akyüz, Turkish general and diplomat (b. 1870)
1944 – Munir Ertegun, Turkish diplomat (b. 1883)
1945 – Jerome Kern, American composer (b. 1885)
1949 – Loukas Kanakaris-Roufos, Greek lawyer and politician, Greek Minister of Foreign Minister (b. 1878)
1950 – Alexandros Diomidis, Greek banker and politician, 145th Prime Minister of Greece (b. 1875)
1953 – Princess Irene of Hesse and by Rhine (b. 1866)
1961 – Behiç Erkin, Turkish colonel and politician, Turkish Minister of Environment and Urban Planning (b. 1876)
1962 – Joseph Ruddy, American swimmer and water polo player (b. 1878)
1965 – Luis Arturo González López Guatemalan supreme court judge and briefly acting president (b. 1900)
1968 – Jeanne Demessieux, French pianist and composer (b. 1921)
1972 – Berry Oakley, American bass player (b. 1948)
1973 – Artturi Ilmari Virtanen, Finnish chemist and academic, Nobel Prize laureate (b. 1895)
  1973   – Richard von Frankenberg, German race car driver and journalist (b. 1922)
1974 – Alfonso Leng, Chilean dentist, composer, and academic (b. 1894)
1976 – Alexander Calder, American sculptor (b. 1898)
1977 – Abraham Sarmiento, Jr., Filipino journalist and activist (b. 1950)
1979 – Dimitri Tiomkin, Ukrainian-American composer and conductor (b. 1894)
1980 – Vince Gair, Australian politician, 27th Premier of Queensland (b. 1901)
1984 – Martin Luther King, Sr., American pastor, missionary, and activist (b. 1899)
1985 – Pelle Lindbergh, Swedish ice hockey player (b. 1959)
  1985   – Arthur Rothstein, American photographer and educator (b. 1915)
1988 – Charles Groves Wright Anderson, South African-Australian colonel and politician (b. 1897)
  1988   – William Ifor Jones, Welsh conductor and organist (b. 1900)
1990 – Attilio Demaría, Argentinian footballer (b. 1909)
  1990   – Sadi Irmak, Turkish physician and politician, 17th Prime Minister of Turkey (b. 1904)
  1990   – Alexis Minotis, Greek actor and director (b. 1898)
  1990   – Yiannis Ritsos, Greek poet and playwright (b. 1909)
1993 – Erskine Hawkins, American trumpet player and bandleader (b. 1914)
  1993   – John Stanley, American author and illustrator (b. 1914)
1994 – John A. Volpe, American soldier and politician, 61st Governor of Massachusetts (b. 1908)
  1994   – Tadeusz Żychiewicz, Polish journalist, historian, and publicist (b. 1922)
1997 – Rod Milburn, American hurdler and coach (b. 1950)
  1997   – William Alland, American film producer and writer (b. 1916)
1998 – Frank Brimsek, American ice hockey player and soldier (b. 1913)
  1998   – Paddy Clancy, Irish singer and actor (b. 1922)
1999 – Mary Kay Bergman, American voice actress (b. 1961)
  1999   – Jacobo Timerman, Argentinian journalist and author (b. 1923)
2000 – Sandra Schmitt, German skier (b. 1981)
2001 – Erna Viitol, Estonian sculptor (b. 1920)
  2002   – Frances Ames, South African neurologist, psychiatrist, and human rights activist (b. 1920)
2003 – Miquel Martí i Pol, Catalan poet (b. 1929)
2004 – Dayton Allen, American comedian and voice actor (b. 1919)
  2004   – Yasser Arafat, Palestinian engineer and politician, 1st President of the Palestinian National Authority, Nobel Prize laureate (b. 1929)
  2004   – Richard Dembo, French director and screenwriter (b. 1948)
2005 – Moustapha Akkad, Syrian-American director and producer (b. 1930)
  2005   – Patrick Anson, 5th Earl of Lichfield, English photographer (b. 1939)
  2005   – Peter Drucker, Austrian-American author, theorist, and educator (b. 1909)
2006 – Belinda Emmett, Australian actress (b. 1974)
2007 – Delbert Mann, American director and producer (b. 1920)
2008 – Herb Score, American baseball player and sportscaster (b. 1933)
  2008   – Mustafa Şekip Birgöl, Turkish colonel (b. 1903)
2010 – Marie Osborne Yeats, American actress and costume designer (b. 1911)
2011 – Francisco Blake Mora, Mexican lawyer and politician, Mexican Secretary of the Interior (b. 1966)
2012 – Lam Adesina, Nigerian educator and politician, Governor of Oyo State (b. 1939)
  2012   – Joe Egan, English rugby player and coach (b. 1919)
  2012   – Rex Hunt, English lieutenant, pilot, and diplomat, Governor of the Falkland Islands (b. 1926)
  2012   – Victor Mees, Belgian footballer (b. 1927)
  2012   – Harry Wayland Randall, American photographer (b. 1915)
2013 – John Barnhill, American basketball player and coach (b. 1938)
  2013   – Domenico Bartolucci, Italian cardinal and composer (b. 1917)
  2013   – Bob Beckham, American singer-songwriter (b. 1927)
  2013   – John S. Dunne, American priest and theologian (b. 1929)
  2013   – Atilla Karaosmanoğlu, Turkish economist and politician, 33rd Deputy Prime Minister of Turkey (b. 1931)
2014 – John Doar, American lawyer and activist (b. 1921)
  2014   – Big Bank Hank, American rapper (b. 1956)
  2014   – Philip G. Hodge, American engineer and academic (b. 1920)
  2014   – Harry Lonsdale, American chemist, businessman, and politician (b. 1932)
  2014   – Carol Ann Susi, American actress (b. 1952)
2015 – Rita Gross, American theologian and author (b. 1943)
  2015   – Nathaniel Marston, American actor and producer (b. 1975)
2016 – Victor Bailey, American singer and bass player (b. 1960)
  2016   – Robert Vaughn, American actor (b. 1932)
2017 – Chiquito de la Calzada, Spanish singer, actor and comedian (b. 1932)
2021 – F. W. de Klerk, South African lawyer and politician, former State President of South Africa, Nobel Prize laureate (b. 1936)

Holidays and observances
Birthday of King Jigme Singye Wangchuck (Bhutan)
Children's Day (Croatia)
Christian feast day:
Bartholomew of Grottaferrata
Martin of Tours (Roman Catholic Church), and its related observances.
Menas
Mercurius (Coptic)
Søren Kierkegaard (Lutheran Church)
Theodore the Studite
November 11 (Eastern Orthodox liturgics)
End of World War I-related observances:
Armistice Day (New Zealand, France, Belgium and Serbia)
National Independence Day (Poland), commemorates the anniversary of Poland's assumption of independent statehood in 1918
Remembrance Day (United Kingdom and the Commonwealth of Nations, including Australia and Canada)
Veterans Day, called Armistice Day until 1954, when it was rededicated to honor American military (Army, Navy, Marine, and Air Force) veterans. (United States)
Independence Day, celebrates the independence of Angola from Portugal in 1975.
Independence of Cartagena (Colombia)
Lāčplēsis Day, celebrates the victory over the Bermontians at the Battle of Riga in 1919. (Latvia)
Opening of carnival ("Karneval"/"Fasching"), on 11-11, at 11:11. (Germany, the Netherlands, and other countries)
National Education Day (India)
Republic Day (Maldives)
Singles' Day (China)
St. Martin's Day (Sint Maarten, Kingdom of the Netherlands)
 Women's Day (Belgium)
Pepero Day (South Korea)

References

External links

 
 
 

Days of the year
November